A total of fifteen special routes of U.S. Route 101 exist.

Los Angeles alternate route

Present SR 1 in the Los Angeles area was U.S. Route 101 Alternate from the mid-1930s to 1964.

Los Angeles bypass route

The precursor to the Santa Ana Freeway between Los Angeles and Anaheim was U.S. Route 101 Bypass from the early 1940s to the mid-1950s, when it became part of US 101. Old US 101 there is now partially SR 72.

Ventura business loop

US 101 Business in Ventura, California is a business loop that follows the former U.S. 101 alignment before the construction of the Ventura Freeway. The route runs along the entirety of Thompson Boulevard and portions of Main Street and Garden Street.

San Francisco bypass route

Until the 1964 renumbering, the present route of US 101 along the Bayshore Freeway was U.S. Route 101 Bypass, and US 101 used SR 82 (El Camino Real) and I-280.

Rio Dell business loop

US 101 Business, called Wildwood Avenue, is a business loop of US 101 through Rio Dell. Its southernmost section between US 101 near Scotia to the north end of the Eel River Bridge is legally defined as an unsigned California State Route 283.

Fortuna business loop

US 101 Business, called Main Street and Fortuna Blvd in its entirety, is a business loop of
US 101 through Fortuna.

McKinleyville business loop

US 101 Business, called Central Ave its entirety, is a business loop of
US 101 through McKinleyville.

Astoria business loop

U.S. Route 101 Business is a business loop of US 101 that travels from Astoria to Warrenton. It is a former alignment of US 101, bypassed in 1964 when a new bridge opened across Youngs Bay. It was originally designated U.S. Route 101 Alternate until about 1976.

Major intersections

Ilwaco alternate route

U.S. Route 101 Alternate is an alternate route of U.S. Route 101 that bypasses the towns of Long Beach and Ilwaco in southwestern Washington.

References

A101
 
01-1
01-1
01-1